Lynn Levy (born November 18, 1931) is an American cross-country skier. He competed in the men's 30 kilometre event at the 1956 Winter Olympics.

References

1931 births
Living people
American male cross-country skiers
American male Nordic combined skiers
Olympic cross-country skiers of the United States
Olympic Nordic combined skiers of the United States
Cross-country skiers at the 1956 Winter Olympics
Nordic combined skiers at the 1956 Winter Olympics
Sportspeople from New Orleans